Kaliště is a municipality and village in Prague-East District in the Central Bohemian Region of the Czech Republic. It has about 300 inhabitants.

Administrative parts
Villages of Lensedly and Poddubí are administrative parts of Kaliště.

References

Villages in Prague-East District